HMS Explorer is an  P2000-type patrol and training vessel of the British Royal Navy. The ship is primarily assigned to the Yorkshire Universities Royal Naval Unit (URNU), serving the universities of Hull, Sheffield and Leeds. The ship is based in Kingston-Upon-Hull and mainly operates on the East coast of the UK, particularly in and around the river Humber.

HMS Explorer is the second ship to bear the name; her predecessor was an unarmed experimental Walter-turbine submarine based on the captured high test peroxide (HTP) powered German Type XVIIB submarine  launched in 1956 and scrapped in 1965.

Construction 

Explorer was built in 1986 by the now-defunct Watercraft Marine for the Royal Naval Auxiliary Service (RNXS) as an Example class tender, to the same design as the Royal Navy Archer class, as XSV Explorer. The Example class were distinguishable from their Royal Navy counterparts by their black painted hull until 2005, though they shared the same characteristics as them, being twin screw vessels constructed from moulded glass-reinforced plastic (GRP).

Operational service 
Explorer served for eight years as a RNXS tender with the pennant number A154 before being transferred to the Royal Navy upon the disbanding of the service in 1994. Upon joining the Naval service, the ship was assigned to the recently formed Yorkshire Universities Royal Navy Unit as its designated training vessel.

The ship's primary role is undergraduate sea training in support of the units programme of navigational skills and seamanship training, and this is accomplished through designated 'sea weekends' as well as Easter and Summer deployments, during which the ship deploys for up to five weeks. During these deployments, the five person ship's company remain 'in theatre' while students are transported out to the ship's location. After receiving a significant engine upgrade in 2014, the ship's range was greatly enhanced and consequently in summer 2015 and 2016 Explorer has deployed to the Baltic Sea where the ship conducted a range of training and local engagements.

In addition to the ship's role as a training vessel, Explorer is also utilised by the Royal Navy for a range of ceremonial and other fleet tasking. The ship's comparatively small size is an asset in this regard, allowing the Royal Navy to "show the White Ensign in places that larger vessels cannot reach". Recent examples of this include regular cooperation with Humberside Police and Humberside Search and Rescue in the Humber, as well as ceremonial operations including providing transport for dignitaries including members of the royal family at the Battle of Jutland Centenary commemorations in June 2016, and acting as guard ship for the 2016 Sunderland Air Show. The ship also takes part in public engagement events in order to raise the profile of the Royal Navy and provide a Naval presence where tasking or size limitations make other ships unsuitable.

As such, they are assigned to the Portsmouth flotilla, although in practise most vessels are based elsewhere.

Notes

References

External links

 

 

Patrol vessels of the Royal Navy
Archer-class patrol vessels
1986 ships